Duane Benjamin Bailey (born 28 October 1991) is a New Zealand former professional basketball player who played in the New Zealand NBL and the Australian NBL.

Early life
Born in Auckland, Bailey played both rugby and basketball in primary school. In 2003 and 2004, he attended Rangeview Intermediate School. For high school, he attended Mount Albert Grammar School where he graduated Year 12 in 2009. In 2010, he attended Fraser High School in Hamilton, New Zealand for one final year where he was a member of Fraser's national championship-winning team.

As a junior, Bailey played in the Conference Basketball League for the JTB/Breakers in 2008 and for the Waikato Titans in 2010.

Professional career

New Zealand NBL
On 22 December 2010, Bailey signed a two-year deal with the Manawatu Jets of the New Zealand National Basketball League. In his rookie season for the Jets, he averaged 4.8 points and 5.2 rebounds in 17 games.

In December 2011, Bailey left the Manawatu Jets, opting out of the second year of his two-year contract due to family and work commitments; he also desired to move back to Auckland. Later that month, he signed with the Auckland Pirates for the 2012 New Zealand NBL season. He won a championship with the Pirates in 2012, and averaged 3.9 points and 3.5 rebounds in 15 games.

In January 2013, Bailey signed with the re-established Super City Rangers for the 2013 New Zealand NBL season. He subsequently had a breakout season playing for the young Rangers squad as he averaged 11.8 points and 7.8 rebounds in 15 games.

On 18 December 2013, Bailey re-signed with the Super City Rangers for the 2014 New Zealand NBL season. He averaged career highs in points (19.4), rebounds (9.3) and assists (1.8) in 2014, as the Rangers improved from last in 2013, to seventh in 2014. Bailey and teammate Jason Cadee were the driving force behind the Rangers resurgence.

On 1 November 2014, Bailey signed with the Southland Sharks for the 2015 New Zealand NBL season. As the team's starting small forward, he was a consistent role player in helping the Sharks finish the regular season with a 15–3 record. He and fellow starting five members Kevin Braswell, Todd Blanchfield, Adrian Majstrovich and Tai Wesley dominated the season, going on to win the 2015 championship with a 72–68 grand final win over the Wellington Saints. In 20 games for the Sharks in 2015, he averaged 10.0 points, 6.8 rebounds and 1.5 assists per game.

On 7 September 2015, Bailey re-signed with the Southland Sharks on a two-year deal. Due to his commitments with the Plymouth Raiders, Bailey missed the Sharks' first 10 games of the 2016 season, making his season debut on 22 April 2016 against the Taranaki Mountainairs. He helped the Sharks finish the regular season with an 11–7 record, but could not lead the team to a grand final berth after losing their semi-final match-up with the Wellington Saints. In nine games for the Sharks in 2016, Bailey averaged 8.8 points, 6.1 rebounds and 1.6 assists per game.

Bailey began the 2017 season operating at '70 to 80' percent, as he battled different leg niggles through the Sharks' first eight games. He helped the Sharks finish the regular season in second place with a 12–6 record, and helped them advance through to the grand final where they were defeated by the Wellington Saints. In 19 games for the Sharks in 2017, Bailey averaged 6.9 points, 3.5 rebounds and 1.2 assists per game.

New Zealand Breakers
In August 2013, Bailey signed with the New Zealand Breakers as a development player for the 2013–14 NBL season. On 28 October 2013, Bailey was elevated to the Breakers' tenth roster spot following the addition of Gary Wilkinson and the release of Darnell Lazare and Jeremiah Trueman. Despite the elevation, he only managed to appear in five games, scoring a total of six points.

On 9 July 2014, Bailey signed a one-year deal (with the option of a second) with the Breakers. Gaining a full roster spot for the 2014–15 season earned Bailey more playing time as he appeared in 27 games, averaging 2.0 points and 1.2 rebounds, and in the process became an Australian NBL champion after the Breakers defeated the Cairns Taipans 2–1 in the best-of-three grand final series.

On 29 April 2015, the Breakers exercised the team option on Bailey's contract, re-signing him for the 2015–16 season. On 20 October 2015, Bailey was released by the Breakers to make way for Corey Webster, who returned from a stint in the NBA. He appeared in three out of the Breakers first four games of the season, recording two points and five rebounds.

Plymouth Raiders
On 9 November 2015, Bailey signed with the Plymouth Raiders for the rest of the 2015–16 British Basketball League season. In 24 games for Plymouth, he averaged 10.5 points, 6.8 rebounds and 3.0 assists per game.

Brisbane Spartans
On 30 May 2016, Bailey signed with the Brisbane Spartans for the rest of the 2016 SEABL season. In 12 games for Brisbane, he averaged 8.4 points, 4.6 rebounds and 1.7 assists per game.

Personal
Bailey has two children.

References

External links
Duane Bailey at sharksbasketball.co.nz
Duane Bailey at foxsportspulse.com

1991 births
Living people
Auckland Pirates players
Manawatu Jets players
New Zealand Breakers players
New Zealand expatriate basketball people in England
New Zealand men's basketball players
Plymouth Raiders players
Power forwards (basketball)
Small forwards
Southland Sharks players
Super City Rangers players